The Joint Medical Service (short form: Zentraler Sanitätsdienst) is a part of the Bundeswehr, the armed forces of Germany and serves all three armed services (Army, Navy and Air Force, as well as the Cyber and Information Domain Service). Members of the central medical corps remain members of their respective military branches. Only a few specialized medical units such as the medical care for divers and aircraft crews are not incorporated in the Joint Medical Service. Prior to 2002 each military branch had its own medical service. The services were then largely merged, forming the Joint Medical Service. In May 2021 the minister of defense Annegret Kramp-Karrenbauer together with Inspector General of the Bundeswehr Eberhard Zorn published a plan to dissolve the Joint Medical Service and to reintegrate its units into the army, navy, airforce and cyber command.

Structure 

Bundeswehr Joint Medical Service Headquarters in Koblenz
Bundeswehr Central Hospital in Koblenz
Bundeswehr Hospital in Hamburg
Bundeswehr Hospital in Berlin
Bundeswehr Hospital in Ulm
Bundeswehr Hospital in Westerstede
Bundeswehr Medical Academy at the Ernst-von-Bergmann-Kaserne in Munich
 Medical Operational Support Command in Weißenfels
 Rapid Deployable Medical Forces Command in Leer
 1st Medical Regiment in Weißenfels and Berlin
 2nd Medical Regiment in Rennerod and Koblenz
 3rd Medical Regiment in Dornstadt
 Medical Demonstration Regiment in Feldkirchen
 Medical Material Supply and Maintenance Center Blankenburg
 Medical Material Supply and Maintenance Center Pfungstadt
 Medical Material Supply and Maintenance Center Quakenbrück
 Medical Regional Support Command in Diez
 Medical Support Center Augustdorf
 Medical Support Center Berlin
 Medical Support Center Cochem
 Medical Support Center Erfurt
 Medical Support Center Hammelburg
 Medical Support Center Kiel
 Medical Support Center Cologne
 Medical Support Center Kümmersbruck
 Medical Support Center Munich
 Medical Support Center Munster
 Medical Support Center Neubrandenburg
 Medical Support Center Stetten am kalten Markt
 Medical Support Center Wilhelmshaven
 Bundeswehr Sport Medicine Center in Warendorf

Ranks of the Joint Medical Service

Army and Airforce

Navy

See also
Military medicine

References

External links 
 

Branches of the Bundeswehr
Germany
Military medicine in Germany
Military units and formations established in 2000
2000 establishments in Germany